Jean-Marie Halsdorf (born 1 February 1957 in Luxembourg City) is a Luxembourgish politician who was Minister for Defence of Luxembourg. He is a member of the Christian Social People's Party (Chrëschtlech Sozial Vollekspartei).

Background and early career

He attended grammar school in Echternach and went to university in Strasbourg, France. In 1988 he was elected to the town council of Pétange.

Mayor of Pétange, Deputy and Cabinet Minister

In 2000, he became Mayor of Pétange.

In 1994 he was elected to the Chamber of Deputies, and in 2004 he became a cabinet minister. At that time, he stepped down as Mayor of Pétange.

Distinctions 
 Officer vum Order of Merit of the Grand Duchy of Luxembourg (Promotioun 1999)
 Officer vum Order of the Oak Crown (Promotion 2004)

References 
 "Jean-Marie Halsdorf", Luxembourg Presidency of the Council of the European Union, 2005. Retrieved May 13, 2010.
 "Biography of Jean-Marie Halsdorf", Luxembourg government. Retrieved May 13, 2010.

External links 

|-

1957 births
Living people
Christian Social People's Party politicians
Mayors of Pétange
Members of the Chamber of Deputies (Luxembourg)
Members of the Chamber of Deputies (Luxembourg) from Sud
Ministers for Defence of Luxembourg
People from Luxembourg City